Improvisations is an album of piano duets by the American jazz pianists Ran Blake and Jaki Byard recorded in 1981 and released on the Italian Soul Note label.

Reception
The Allmusic review by Scott Yanow awarded the album 3 stars stating "Because Byard (who can play credibly in virtually every jazz style) is highly flexible, he was able to meet Blake on his own terms and inspire him to play more extrovertedly than usual... In other words, this matchup works".

Track listing
All compositions by Ran Blake & Jaki Byard except as indicated
 "On Green Dolphin Street" (Bronislau Kaper, Ned Washington) - 6:06 
 "Prelude" - 4:09 
 "Chromatics" - 8:28 
 "Wende" (Ran Blake) - 3:42 
 "Tea for Two" (Irving Caesar, Vincent Youmans) - 6:57 
 "Victoria" (Greg Silberman) - 4:41 
 "Sonata for Two Pianos" - 10:35
Recorded at Barigozzi Studio in Milano, Italy on May 25 & 26, 1981

Personnel
Jaki Byard – piano
Ran Blake - piano

References

Black Saint/Soul Note albums
Jaki Byard albums
Ran Blake albums
1981 albums